The Siege (Opsada) is a Croatian film directed by Branko Marjanović. It was released in 1956.

External links
 
 Opsada, Branko Marjanović, 1956. 

1956 films
1950s Croatian-language films
Yugoslav comedy-drama films
Yugoslav World War II films
Jadran Film films
Croatian black-and-white films
Yugoslav black-and-white films